Graeme R. Anderson (born 5 January 1953) is a former Australian rules footballer who played for Collingwood in the Victorian Football League (VFL).

Recruited from Victorian Football Association (VFA) club Port Melbourne, Anderson was a tough forward who would occasionally play in the midfield as a ruck-rover.

Anderson missed the 1978 season after playing in both 1977 Grand Finals against North Melbourne. He played in the 1979 Grand Final against Carlton.

At the end of the 1980 season, Anderson's tenure with The Magpies ended, and after 71 VFL games, he returned to the Port Melbourne Football Club the following year.

Anderson's father (Claude Anderson), brother (Syd Anderson), and uncle (Syd Anderson) all played in the VFL.

References

External links
 
 

1953 births
Living people
Collingwood Football Club players
Port Melbourne Football Club players
Australian rules footballers from Victoria (Australia)